Good Neighbours or Good Neighbors may refer to

 Good Neighbors (1975), a British television series, also called The Good Life
 "Good Neighbors", a 2005 episode of the American animated series SpongeBob SquarePants
 Good Neighbours (2010), a Canadian black comedy-drama/thriller film

See also 
 
 
 The Good Neighbour (disambiguation)
 Good Friends (disambiguation)